Hujing Island / Huching Island / Hujing Islet is an islet in Hujing Village, Magong City, Penghu County (the Pescadores), Taiwan. The island has also been known as Da'anshan and the nearby Tongpan Island as Xiao'anshan. The southern part of the island is crossed by the Tropic of Cancer. Hujing Island is the seventh largest island in Penghu (the Pescadores). There are mountains on the eastern end (Dongshan) and western end (Sishan) of the island.

Ferries run three times a day between Magong on the main island of Penghu and Hujing Island. It takes about twenty minutes to reach Hujing Island from Penghu's main island by boat.

History
The island takes its current name from a tradition in which a tiger was found in a dry cave (or well) near the south end of the island.

According to tradition, the Dutch built a fortress on the island which sank into the sea. No significant discoveries have been made in the area.

On July 12, 1683, Qing Empire naval forces took Hujing Island and Tongpan Island in the early stages of the Battle of Penghu.

A World War II-era Japanese bomb shelter built on the island survives and is accessible to the public free of charge.

In January 2019, there were noted complaints about collapsing roads and slow repair times around the western mountain area of the island.

In June 2019, there were a total of six students in the island's primary school.

Geography
The population of Hujing (Huching) village, noted for its seafood restaurants, is concentrated on the southwest end of the island.

The island's geology is noted for black volcanic rock formations. The island is higher in altitude than nearby Tongpan Island with a plain between the mountainous areas where most of the population lives.

Gallery

See also
 Penghu National Scenic Area
 List of islands of Taiwan
 List of places with columnar jointed volcanics
 Tiger in Chinese culture

References

External links

 【澎湖踩點】遺世小島虎井嶼　島上貓比人多 | 台灣蘋果日報 ('Understanding Penghu- The Forgotten Little Island: Hujing Island- More Cats than People on the Island- Taiwan Apple Daily') 

Islands of Taiwan
Landforms of Penghu County